Thomas John Rippon (6 July 1918 – 29 December 1994) was a Welsh cricketer.  Rippon was a right-handed batsman who played as a wicket-keeper.  Rippon was during his time with Glamorgan, very much the understudy to Haydn Davies.  He was born at Swansea, Glamorgan.

Rippon made his first-class debut for Glamorgan in 1947 against Warwickshire.  He played two further first-class matches: In 1947 against Northamptonshire and in 1948 against Somerset.  In his 3 first-class matches, he scored 45 runs at a batting average of 22.50, with a high score of 30.  Behind the stumps he made 3 stumpings.

References

External links
Jack Rippon at ESPNcricinfo
Jack Rippon at CricketArchive

1918 births
1994 deaths
Cricketers from Swansea
Welsh cricketers
Glamorgan cricketers
Wicket-keepers